Larry Stock, December 4, 1896 - April 5, 1984) was an American songwriter.

Biography
Born 'Lazarus Goldberger' in 1896 in New York City, the son of Adolf Goldberger and Ella Goldberger ne Ehrlich. Ella Ehrlich and her sister Bella along with their mother Rosa, emigrated from Hungary in 1888. Adolf Goldberger died in 1898. In 1901, Ella Goldberger married Abram Rosenstock. Lazarus Goldberger was named Lawrence Rosenstock.  

At twelve, he was accepted by the school that later became the Juilliard School. After graduating at sixteen he continued his studies at the City College of New York. He died in 1984 in New Jersey, at the age of 87.

One of his Aunt Bella's grandsons, became well known in a different music field, coining the phrase "Rhythm and Blues", and being one of the founders of Atlantic Records. This was the noted Jerry Wexler.

Songs he composed or wrote
He co-wrote the Fats Domino hit with Al Lewis "Blueberry Hill", the Dean Martin hit "You're Nobody till Somebody Loves You", "Morning Side of the Mountain" (recorded by Tommy Edwards and The Osmonds), and "You Won't Be Satisfied (Until You Break My Heart)", a hit by Doris Day featuring Les Brown and his orchestra.

References

1896 births
1984 deaths
Songwriters from New York (state)
Musicians from New York City
American people of Hungarian descent
20th-century American composers